The 1874 Philadelphia mayoral election saw the reelection of William S. Stokley. He defeated Alexander McClure, an independent candidate who was supported by the Democratic party.

Results

References

1874
Philadelphia
Philadelphia mayoral
19th century in Philadelphia